The qualification for the Basketball at the 2012 Summer Olympics – Women's tournament took place from 2010–2012; all five FIBA (International Basketball Federation) zones sent in teams.

The first qualifying tournament was the 2010 FIBA World Championship for Women in which the champion was guaranteed of a place in the Olympics. Throughout the next two years, several regional tournaments served as qualification for the zonal tournaments, which doubled as continental championships, to determine which teams would participate in the 2012 London Summer Olympics.

Qualification

Outright qualification
A total of 12 teams took part in the Olympics, with each NOC potentially nominating one team. The host nation (Great Britain) qualified automatically as hosts.

There were a total of 5 zonal tournaments (doubling as continental championships) that determined the qualifying teams, with a total of 5 teams qualifying outright. Each zone was allocated with the following qualifying berths:
FIBA Africa: 1 team (Champion)
FIBA Americas: 1 teams (Champion)
FIBA Asia: 1 team (Champion)
FIBA Europe: 1 teams (Champion)
FIBA Oceania: 1 team (Champion)

Furthermore, the current world champion, United States qualified automatically by winning at the 2010 FIBA World Championship for Women.

Qualification via the wild card tournament
The additional five teams were determined at the 2012 FIBA World Olympic Qualifying Tournament for Women, with the best non-qualifying teams participating from teams that did not qualify outright. Each zone was allocated with the following berths:

FIBA Africa: 2 teams
FIBA Americas: 3 teams
FIBA Asia: 2 teams
FIBA Europe: 4 teams
FIBA Oceania: 1 team

Summary
These are the final standings of the different Olympic qualifying tournaments. The venues are as follows, with the city of the knockout stage mentioned first:
2010 FIBA World Championship for Women: Brno, Karlovy Vary, Ostrava, Czech Republic
2011 FIBA Africa Championship for Women: Mali
2011 FIBA Americas Championship for Women: Neiva, Colombia
2011 FIBA Asia Championship for Women: Ōmura, Japan
EuroBasket Women 2011: Bydgoszcz, Katowice, Łódź, Poland
2011 FIBA Oceania Championship for Women: Australia
2012 FIBA World Olympic Qualifying Tournament for Women: Ankara, Turkey

Wild card tournament

This tournament consisted of 12 teams of which the top five teams earned a place in the Olympic Basketball tournament. It was held 25 June – 1 July 2012 in Ankara, Turkey.  The top eight teams qualified for the knockout round.  All four quarterfinal winners advanced to the Olympics, then the four quarterfinal losers played two rounds to allocate the final slot.  The four European teams won their quarterfinal matches, and Canada qualified for the final slot.

References

 
2012
qualification